Mohammad Fadel may refer to:
 Mohammad Fadel, a Professor and Toronto Research Chair for the Law and Economics
 Mohammed Fadel, Egyptian film director
 Mohammed Fadel (footballer), Iraqi footballer